Arjundhara is a municipality in Jhapa District of Province No. 1 in Eastern Nepal. It was formed in 2014 by merging the former village development committees Arjundhara, Shanischare, and Khudunabari. It was named Shani-Arjun initially but was changed to Arjundhara again in January 2017. It is named after a holy place situated here, Arjundhara Temple. At the time of the 2011 Nepal census it had a population of 60,205 people living in 13,623 individual households.

History 
Brief ancient history have an prof in existing the temple which belongs to ancient story Mahabharata. The pond inside the temple have that prof at the time when pandav were sentenced for banbas, Arjun pointed the arrow to the ground for thirsty cow who were in need of water. so it was name as Arjundhara.In 2017, the villages of Arjundhara and Sanischare were merged to form Arjundhara municipality.
Sanischare/Arjundhara was established by the Dhakals when they settled in the plains after emigrating from the immediate hills (Namsaling, Ilam) in the north. Jaya Prasad Dhakal son of Abhinarayan Dhakal was a prominent industrialist of the area. Later in life he devoted a lot of his time writing and critiquing Nepali literature. He was a pragmatist and much of his writings were inspired by Postmodern literature. Sanischare now Arjundhara was the first place in the entire country of Nepal to have a fruit canning industry in the 60s owned by Jaya Prasad Dhakal, later he also pioneered rubber plantation in Nepal. Back then, in the 60s and 70s Sanischare was known to be very industrial, but due to inflation and natural disasters mainly flooding Sanischare for a short while lost its gumption for growth and development. Sanischare continues to grow in population as it joins with Arjundhara and strives to be a progressive municipality in terms of politics and socio-economic reforms.Current mayor of Arjundhara Municipality is Baldev Singh Gomden Tamang.

References

Populated places in Jhapa District
Municipalities in Koshi Province
Nepal municipalities established in 2014
Municipalities in Jhapa District